Oze may refer to:

People
 Akira Oze (born 1947), Japanese manga artist
 Hiroyuki Oze (1985–2010), Japanese baseball player
 Lajos Őze (1935–1984), Hungarian actor

Places
 Oze, Hautes-Alpes, France
 Oze National Park, Japan
 Oze River, Japan

Fictional characters
 Ikumi Oze, character in Infinite Ryvius
 Maki Oze, character in Fire Force

Other
 7358 Oze, minor planet
 oze, species of bat also known as Ikonnikov's bat